Lashkhareh (also Romanized as Lashkharah; also known as Lashkhar) is a village in Howmeh Rural District, in the Central District of Lamerd County, Fars Province, Iran. At the 2006 census, its population was 205, in 44 families.

References 

Populated places in Lamerd County